LWRC SABR (Sniper Assaulter Battle Rifle) is a semi-automatic 7.62 caliber, or assault rifle manufactured by LWRC International. The gun is considered a sniper rifle and it preceded the LWRC REPR.

Design details 

The gun features the LWRC designed short-stroke gas-piston operating system. It has removable Picatinny rails and it could accommodate the installation of several other uppers with different barrel lengths, including 12.7”, 16.1”, 18” and 20”.

Operation 

There is a side charging handle so that the user does not have to take their eyes off of the target. The rifle was the first sniper rifle that was produced by LWRCI. It was replaced by the LWRC REPR. The SABR was heavier than the REPR.

The gun is one of the many that is banned in Canada.

References

7.62 mm firearms
Rifles of the United States
LWRC International semi-automatic firearms
Short stroke piston firearms
2010 introductions
ArmaLite AR-10 derivatives